Schwarzer Peter is German for Black Peter and may refer to: 

 Johann Peter Petri (1752–after 1812), German robber, known as Schwarzer Peter
 Schwarzer Peter (card game), the German children's card game of Black Peter
 Schwarzer Peter, an opera by Norbert Schultze (1911–2002)
 , a 2009 German TV film by Christine Hartmann

See also
 Black Peter (disambiguation)